The Church of St. James the Greater Apostle is a parish in Sokolniki, Września County, Poland, built in the thirteenth century. Its consecration took place in 1416. The current church, constructed in neo-baroque style, was built 1926 and consecrated by August Hlond on 28 August 1932. It is one of 10 parishes within the deanery. On 6 September 2009, the Board of Greater Poland approved the list of operations for the Rural Development Programme for the years 2007 to 2013. The district thus received a grant to repair the church roof.

Documents
Parish registers:
 Baptisms since 1795
 Marriages since 1795
 Deaths since 1795

Bibliography 
 Piotr Maluśkiewicz: Barokowe kościoły Wielkopolski. Wydawnictwo Wojewódzkiej Biblioteki Publicznej i Centrum Animacji Kultury, Poznań 2006,

References

Gmina Kołaczkowo
Sokolniki